Torin Damon Dorn Sr. (born February 29, 1968) is a former professional American football cornerback in the  National Football League. He played seven seasons for the Los Angeles Raiders (1990–1994) and the St. Louis Rams (1995–1996). Dorn Sr. played college football for University of North Carolina at Chapel Hill from 1986-1989 where he played both running back and defensive back. Initially Dorn Sr. played running back for the first three seasons, and then played defensive back as a senior. 

One of his sons, Torin Dorn Jr., plays basketball for the NC State Wolfpack men's basketball team after transferring from the Charlotte 49ers following his freshman season. His other son, Myles Dorn, played college football for the North Carolina Tar Heels football team and was signed to the Minnesota Vikings in 2020.

References

1968 births
Living people
People from Greenwood, South Carolina
Sportspeople from Southfield, Michigan
Players of American football from Michigan
American football cornerbacks
North Carolina Tar Heels football players
Los Angeles Raiders players
St. Louis Rams players